Eng Wah Global, formerly Eng Wah Organisation and Eng Wah Theatres Organisation, is a Singaporean company spans entertainment, properties, hospitality, and lifestyle in Singapore and Malaysia.

History
In 1946, Goh Eng Wah and his partner in a business to import and screen Shanghai films, rented a performance stage at Happy World Amusement Park at Geylang, which were later renovated and opened as Victory Theatre.

In the late 1960s, Goh has formed Eng Wah Theatres Organisation Pte Ltd, expanded his cinema chain to Raffles Hotel (Jubilee Hall) (1966) and King's Theatre at Tiong Bahru (1968).

In the 1970s and 1980s, the cinema expanded  into new HDB towns in Toa Payoh, Ang Mo Kio, Clementi and Kallang. The major expansion made Eng Wah hold its position as the leading film exhibitor and distributor.

In 1988, Eng Wah has clinched the operation rights for Marina Theatre, making its debut in the downtown Singapore.

On 7 July 1994, the cinema became the first operator to be listed in the SGX 1 as Eng Wah Organisation. At the same time, it also converts its single screen cinemas into entertainment centres at Clementi (1995), Ang Mo Kio (1996), Toa Payoh (1997) and formed a cineplex joint venture with Shaw to manage the 4 screen Lot 1 Cineplex at the Lot 1 Shoppers Mall in Choa Chu Kang (1996).

In the late 1990s, the group again expanded its cinema chains to newer HDB towns in Bukit Batok (1998), Pasir Ris (1997) and Sembawang (2000). It also open its first cineplex in downtown at Suntec City (1998).

In the early 2000s, it became the first cinema exhibitor in Singapore to implement an on-line loyalty programme named Friends of Eng Wah as well as  providing the SMS-a-movie service (2002). Eng Wah is the first exhibitor outside of the United States to deploy a full 2K Digital Cinema system and first exhibitor in the world to commercially screen a full 2K-enabled digital movie. In addition, the group have the most 2K Digital Cineplex in the world (2004).

In 2005, the group signed a deal with Crazy Horse but closed in 2007 due to poor patronage.

In 2007, the cinema is one of the first showcase 4D Digital cinema technology with Spider-Man 3 on 1 May 2007 at Suntec City.

In 2008, the group went through a reverse handover with Transcu and sold the properties to Mr Goh Eng Wah's company for $99.5 million.

In early 2010s, the group announced to spend $100 million to revamp the cinemas and opens Hotel Fort Canning. Eng Wah Cinemas has rebrand itself as WE Cinemas following a renovation at Suntec City outlet. (2011)

In 2015, 321 Clementi opens after two years hiatus from the cinema operation since the closure of West Mall and Suntec City outlets.

Events
Since 2007, the group is the principal partner for the National Day Parade .

In 2010, the group is the first to pledge support to Singapore's bid for the Youth Olympic Games 2010.

In 2012, WE Cinemas hosted the F!rst Film Fest 2012 at Suntec City on 9 April with Institute of Technical Education for the short film competition to mark its 1st birthday.

Awards
Eng Wah was placed among the top 100 Asian companies in CIO Asia's CIO 100 List. (2005)

Eng Wah Suntec was featured as the cineplex for Best Service, Best Snack Bar, Best Sound – The Sunday Times (2006)

Eng Wah was awarded as SPBA Heritage Brand Award Winner (2006)

Eng Wah was elected as one of the "100 Singapore Icons"; a representation of logos, symbols, trademarks and icons that are significant to Singapore's social history and visual culture. (2010)

Eng Wah Global Operations

Shopping Mall
Eng Wah Global owns 2 shopping malls, Jubilee Square and 321 Clementi, located at the two heartland town centres in Ang Mo Kio and Clementi respectively.

In 1972, Eng Wah Organisation opened the Toa Payoh Cinema in Toa Payoh Town Centre. In November 1997, the cinema converted into a shopping mall, Toa Payoh Entertainment Centre, comprising retail outlets and a 5 hall cineplex. Due to declining ticket sales for the cinema and little customers to the Entertainment Centre, the Toa Payoh Entertainment Centre was closed down on 9 December 2010. The building was subsequently sold to Hersing Pte Ltd and renamed as ERA Centre.

In 1979, Eng Wah Organization opened the Jubilee Cinema in Ang Mo Kio Town Centre. The complex is converted into an entertainment centre in 1996, Jubilee Entertainment Centre, expanding its retail space and a 4 hall cineplex. Due to fierce competition from the 8 hall Cathay AMK Hub and declining ticket sales, the cinema was closed down to make way for retail space. In 2012, the revamped mall is opened as Jubilee Square. 

In 1981, Eng Wah Organization opened the Empress Cinema in Clementi Town Centre. The complex is converted into an entertainment centre in 1995, Empress Cineplex, comprising a 3 hall cineplex and retail outlets. The entertainment centre was closed in 2006 for redevelopment opened in 2015 as 321 Clementi.

Hotels
Eng Wah Global owns three hotel properties, two in Singapore, Hotel Fort Canning and The Legends Fort Canning Park, and one in Malaysia.

Cinemas
WE Cinemas (Chinese 荣华戏院）is a Singaporean cinema operator managed by Eng Wah Global Pte Ltd. Previously known as Eng Wah Cinemas, it was rebranded to its current name in April 2011

WE Cinemas currently has 1 cinema in Singapore.

Former locations (as Eng Wah Cinemas)

See also
 List of cinemas in Singapore
 Cathay Cineplexes
 Golden Village
 Shaw Theatres

References

External links
 

Cinema chains in Singapore
Hotels in Singapore
Shopping malls in Singapore
Singaporean brands